Mohsen Rastani (born 6 January 1958) is an Iranian photographer and photojournalist. He mainly makes photographs of people on a black-and-white basis with a white background.

Career
Rastani was born on 6 January 1958 in Khorramshahr. He returned to the city in 1982 shortly after the Liberation of Khorramshahr in the Iran–Iraq War. Rastani returned from Tehran, where he was studying for the entrance exams to the Faculty of Fine Arts. At that point he started photography.

He earned in B.A. in photography at the Faculty of Fine Arts of the University of Tehran in 1987. He has lectured at the same institute as well.

Works
Rastani typically photographs people on a white background in black-and-white. He has said it is difficult to exhibit his works in Iran due to people posing for his photos in outfits they wear at home. His work, amongst others, has covered the Iran–Iraq War, the Lebanese Civil War in the late 1980s and the Bosnian War in the 1990s. They have amongst others been exhibited at the MAXXI in Rome, Italy.

Rastani was one of the four Iranian artists elected to represent the country at the International Art Exhibition of the 2011 Venice Biennale.

References

1958 births
Living people
People from Khorramshahr
University of Tehran alumni
Academic staff of the University of Tehran
Iranian photographers
Iranian photojournalists